Cirrus is an album by American jazz vibraphonist Bobby Hutcherson recorded in 1974 and released on the Blue Note label.

Reception 
The Allmusic review by Stephen Thomas Erlewine awarded the album 4 stars and stated "While it doesn't quite match the heights of their early collaborations, Cirrus finds Bobby Hutcherson resuming his partnership with tenor saxophonist Harold Land, and the results are quite good... The music is a little smoother than their earlier collaborations, but there are enough captivating, provocative moments to make the reunion a success".

Track listing 
All compositions by Bobby Hutcherson except as indicated
 "Rosewood" (Woody Shaw) - 7:40 
 "Even Later" - 8:56 
 "Wrong or Right" - 7:26 
 "Zuri Dance" - 8:25 
 "Cirrus" - 7:18
Recorded at Wally Heider Sound Studio III, Los Angeles, California on April 17 (track 4) and April 18 (tracks 1-3 & 5), 1974.

Personnel 
 Bobby Hutcherson - vibes, marimba
 Woody Shaw - trumpet
 Emanuel Boyd, Harold Land - tenor saxophone, flute
 William Henderson - piano, electric piano
 Ray Drummond - bass
 Larry Hancock - drums
 Kenneth Nash - percussion

References 

Blue Note Records albums
Bobby Hutcherson albums
1974 albums